Life Sentence is an EP released on September 1, 2003 by Epicure.

Track listing
 "Life Sentence"
 "Dark Room Candle Burning"
 "Armies Against Me"
 "Now I've Found You"
 "Isolate"

Notes
All songs written by Epicure.
Tracks 1,2 and 4 were recorded and mixed by Cameron McKenzie at Station Place.
Track 3 was recorded by Cameron McKenzie and mixed by Chris Dickie.
Track 5 was recorded and mixed by Steve James at Festival Studios, Sydney.
Artwork by Tim Bignell.

Charts

References

2003 EPs